The American Bach Soloists (ABS) is an American baroque orchestra based in the San Francisco Bay Area. The orchestra was founded in Belvedere, California in 1989. Performers share music from Johann Sebastian Bach and his contemporaries during the Classical era, including Handel, Vivaldi, and Mozart, with modern audiences.

History 
Since 1998, ABS has performed Handel's Messiah at Grace Cathedral during the Christmas season.

In February 2020, ABS released a compilation album featuring Bach's cantatas and other early music pieces.

American Bach Soloists Academy 
In 2010, ABS began hosting the American Bach Soloists Academy, an annual two-week summer training program at the San Francisco Conservatory of Music. Each year, more than 50 advanced students of early music convene for coaching, rehearsals, and classes. Following the academy, musicians publicly perform baroque selections as a part of the ABS Festival.

Music director 
The American Bach Soloists are led by artistic and music director Jeffrey Thomas. Jeffrey is a conductor and tenor vocalist. He studied at the Oberlin Conservatory of Music, Manhattan School of Music, the Juilliard School of Music and at Cambridge University.

Discography 
 Section in progress

Notable performers 
 Aryeh Nussbaum Cohen

Collaborations
Performances at the Berkeley Festival and Exhibition
Henry Purcell's opera Dido and Aeneas with the San Francisco Opera Center and The Crucible in Oakland, CA
Works by Claudio Monteverdi, George Frideric Handel's Dixit Dominus, and Virgil Thomson's Four Saints in Three Acts with the Mark Morris Dance Group
George Frideric Handel's Music for the Royal Fireworks with laser lighting display by Lighting Systems Design, Inc. (Orlando, FL) in Grace Cathedral, San Francisco

References

Musical groups established in 1989
Chamber orchestras
Musical groups from San Francisco
Choirs in the San Francisco Bay Area
Early music choirs
Early music groups
Early music orchestras
Early music record labels
1989 establishments in California
Orchestras based in California
Bach orchestras